Yamaguchi Keizō (山口圭蔵, November 3, 1861 – June 15, 1932) was a Japanese general in the Imperial Japanese Army. He held the court rank of Junior Fourth Rank.

Life 
Yamaguchi was born on November 3, 1861, in Kyoto, the eldest son of shizoku Yamaguchi Masakiyo.

He graduated from the Imperial Japanese Army Academy in 1879, and was appointed second lieutenant. In 1885, he graduated from the Army War College.

In 1890, Yamaguchi was appointed to the 2nd Bureau of the General Staff Office. He was promoted to major in 1891, and was appointed an instructor at the Military Medical School in 1893. The following year, he was appointed 2nd Battalion Commander of the 21st Infantry Regiment and fought in the First Sino-Japanese War.

On October 11, 1897, Yamaguchi was appointed colonel of the Army Infantry, principal of the Toyama Military Academy, and director of the Kangunbu (a management organization of the Imperial Japanese Army). The next year, he was appointed Chief of Staff, 11th Division.

Yamaguchi was made major general and appointed commander of the 5th Infantry Brigade on May 5, 1902. However, during the Russo-Japanese War, Nanbu Shinpei replaced Yamaguchi as acting commander in 1904. Yamaguchi was officially dismissed from the post and sent to temporary retirement in January 1905. In March 1907, he was placed in service in the first reserve.

He received the court rank of Junior Fourth Rank on April 20, 1907.

Family 

 Eldest daughter: Chiyoko (married Count Saigō Jūdō's seventh son)
 Second daughter: Yaeko (married Baron Yoshitoki Sugitani)
 Third daughter: Mihoko (married Count Nobutomi Ōki)

Orders 

 Order of the Sacred Treasure, 6th class, Silver Rays (1893)
 Order of the Sacred Treasure, 4th class, Gold Rays with Rosette (1902)
 Order of the Sacred Treasure, 3rd class, Gold Rays with Neck Ribbon (1904)

References 

Japanese generals
People of the First Sino-Japanese War
People of the Russo-Japanese War
People from Kyoto Prefecture
1861 births
1932 deaths